is a Japanese manga series written and illustrated by Haro Aso. It was serialized in Shogakukan's shōnen manga magazine Weekly Shōnen Sunday from December 2007 to December 2008, and later in Club Sunday website from December 2008 to July 2009. Its chapters were collected in seven tankōbon volumes. In North America, the series was licensed for English release by Viz Media, who serialized it online at ShonenSunday.com and later released its volumes in print.

Plot
13-year-old Shunpei Closer is viewed as a weak and timid teenager. His grandfather, Alsyd Closer, was a magician, the "Sorcerer King." Alsyd would travel around the world constantly, only stopping in Japan every now and then to tell tales of his journeys to Shunpei. Before leaving to Africa on Shunpei's 7th birthday, Alsyd gave Shunpei a teddy bear named Hyde. Shunpei quickly grows attached to Hyde, stating it was his best friend. Six years have passed, and Shunpei comes home one day, only to receive a package that had a stuffed animal in it. Soon, Shunpei is attacked by the toy, and is almost killed. But before getting killed, Shunpei is cornered into his room, and as the toy was about to strike, Hyde comes to life, and protects Shunpei against the toy. Shunpei is frightened of the fact that Hyde came to life at first, but Hyde quickly calms him down and explains how Shunpei is the number one target of every magician in the world. At this moment, the stuffed animal from earlier is still alive, and ruthlessly attacks Hyde with knives and forks. Hyde is at a disadvantage because his only weapon is in his back, and he can not reach it himself, meaning he needs Shunpei to do it for him. Shunpei struggles to get away from the fight, but he remembers how he was treated at school, and calls himself "pathetic". Summoning up his courage, Shunpei returns to the fight, and brings out the Texas Chainsaw within Hyde. With this new weapon, the stuffed animal is easily destroyed. With the duo finishing up their first battle of many to come, Shunpei learns more about his grandfather than he could have possibly dared, and to overcome the coward that he and everyone else thought he was. Shunpei eventually meets more allies and learns about "The Six", a group of sorcerers who are after him, and "The Watcher in the Window", a mysterious magic user. Shunpei also learns more about his family history with magic and what truly happened to his grandfather.

Characters

Main characters

A 13-year-old timid teenager. Shunpei has spiky black hair and blue eyes. He wears a as-yet-explained necklace that holds what seems to be a half light blue, and half dark blue Magatama. Shunpei is harshly looked down upon by his classmates every day, as he seems to have no special abilities and messes up at everything. In chapter 2, Shunpei uses magic for the first time. And in chapter 3, Shunpei is told by Hyde that Shunpei needs to be able to learn more magic because protecting Shunpei, and fighting an enemy is very hard since both of them are fighting stronger enemies as the story goes on. Shunpei, at first, strongly believes that he can not do anything, but when Hyde came along and corrected him, Shunpei began to think otherwise. Hyde states in chapter 4 that Shunpei has the potential to become a very strong magician. Otherwise, Hyde would've stopped hanging around Shunpei a long time ago. In later chapters, Shunpei has shown bravery when in battles with other magic-users. For instance, in chapter eleven, Shunpei, and Uryuu had to use umbrellas to block the light from some overhead lights to give Hyde the advantage against a battle with a Shadow user, (He stabs other people's shadows using his own shadow) but the last light was too far to be able to hang the umbrella over it. But seeing as Hyde had the chance of losing, and dying, Shunpei gathered up his courage, and jumped to the headlight, and successfully blocked the light, leaving Hyde to finish off his opponent. Another example of how Shunpei has changed since Hyde entered his life was in chapter twenty one, where Shunpei was determined to control an item he had received. Shunpei and Hyde were attacked by what looked to be a giant, and although Hyde attempted to help, Shunpei asked to fight alone and eventually Shunpei won the battle.
 
A teddy bear that was given to Shunpei on his 7th birthday. Hyde had not shown any reaction until an enemy attempts to assassinate Shunpei. Hyde addresses Shunpei as either "Shun", or "Shun boy", just like Alsyd, probably because of Alsyd's magic in Hyde himself. Hyde is calm when outside of battle, and puts on a blank face that shows no emotion, like a normal teddy bear. He seems to be nice to Shunpei and his mother. Hyde states that he thinks that Shun has potential, only he needs to toughen up a bit. Hyde is the one who has been proving Shunpei wrong when Shunpei thought of himself as weak and cowardly. In his back, he holds a chainsaw named the Texas Chainsaw. Oddly, the chainsaw stands about twice as tall as Hyde himself, but can easily fit inside Hyde. When he fights, he normally gets an evil grin on his face, showing he might enjoy the idea of getting rid of the doll and thereby getting rid of the user; when he uses his Texas Chainsaw, his face becomes shadowed over, making his grin appear more cruel. Hyde always has a chocolate cigar in his mouth, except when he is being carried around by Shunpei. Besides the Texas Chainsaw, Hyde shows superhuman strength in chapter six when he throws a full sized locker through a window. In chapter seven, Shindou reveals that Hyde's magical power is different from those of a normal magical doll, and reveals that Hyde has a limited amount of magical power in his body, that he is keeping a secret from Shunpei. In chapter twenty-seven, Hyde himself states that he does not have much time left, and the magical power within him is limited. A bit of Hyde's past is also revealed in this chapter, showing that Hyde was originally a parting gift from the father of Marco when he lived seventy years ago, before the events of Magic Ban Removal. Unfortunately, soon after receiving Hyde, Marco was killed in his apartment in the middle of an air raid of his town, and, with his last few moments, dropped Hyde from the window in hopes that he would survive (let it be noted that at the time Hyde was nothing more than a bear, but Marco treated Hyde like a younger brother). It was six years before the start of the story that Alsyd found Hyde in the display of a merchant and, for whatever reason, knew about what the bear went through, bought Hyde and charged him with protecting Shunpei. Additionally, despite the fact that he was inanimate then, Hyde is still able to remember Marco.
  
A girl in Shunpei's class. She is a huge fan of a TV drama with an incredible manly male lead. She at first dislikes Shunpei due to his cowardice, until they are attacked by a curse user after school when it is their turn to clean the classroom. Tatsumi fell in love with Hyde after the incident, much to Shunpei's shock. But as time passes by, her feelings start to shift towards Shunpei.
  
Shindou is a soccer star in Shunpei's school, and although almost every girl in the school admires him, his only love is a strange one at that: a black-haired doll named Tomiko, and talks to it as if it was a living object. (Tomiko is later shown to be a magical doll like Hyde.) Behind his graceful look, he is actually a magic-user. His style of fighting is different from the first two magic-users. Instead of hiding and standing from the sidelines, sending his/or magic power for the magical doll to do his/her "dirty work", Shindou and Tomiko instead fight together, therefore increasing the strength of Tomiko. (Hyde explains that the farther away the magic-user is from his magical doll, the less magic power he/she could send to their doll.) Growing up, Shindou's only friend was Tomiko as his rich father early on bought the neighborhood he lived in and forced his friends to move because he did not want Shindou to be friends with those he considers "scum". Despite the battle between Shindou and Shunpei, the two later become allies.
Tomiko is a small doll, and is apparently in some sort of relationship with Shindou. His reason to attack Shunpei is to use the Alsyd's blood within Shunpei to turn Tomiko into a real woman (because Shindou states that no one would accept a relationship with a doll). She states that she loves Shindou, and vice versa, which apparently "creeps" Shunpei out. She is apparently based on a woman of the same name who never married, and has been handed down to each new generation in Shindou's mother's family.
  
Odd, and easy to stand out, Ana quickly catches the attention of many in her introduction in the series. She comes looking for the power of Closer, but to Shunpei's surprise, she at first believed she would need to eat Shunpei's toenails to gain his power. Shunpei cleared up the misunderstanding, telling her the truth while believing she would not be the kind of person to kill someone else. As a child, Ana was shown to be bullied by other boys constantly because of her height, but quickly became friends with them when she stood up to them with the help of a hippie looking-sort of person named Bosh. He however was killed by yet another unnamed man. Angered by the man's actions, she swears to get stronger to kill him, leading to Ana wanting the power of Closer. Despite being enemies for some time, Ana becomes an ally of Shunpei and company.
Shakka-Shakka Mekki is a doll whose name is most likely a play on his maracas that he constantly carries around. Ana activates Shakka-Shakka's power by using her boombox to play different sorts of music. Each CD can activate an ability.
  
A very large man with spiky dreadlocked hair. Called Holy Father by the children, even though he is not a real priest. Growing up, he lived on the streets and stole and fought in order to survive, losing all sense of fear, until one day when he killed a woman's son and was sentenced to death. As his sentence grew closer, Kazan started to become scared of dying and, realizing his victim must have felt the same way, regretted his actions. On the day of his execution, the boy's mother dropped the charges against him and later told him that since he felt remorse, it was better for him to live on instead of die. He fights alongside Desmond, often charging recklessly against the enemy.
Desmond is a traditional Tinplate doll that looks like a small suit or armour with skinny legs, and four eyes. He dislikes noisy crowds and sometimes scolds Kazan for acting reckless. Fires projectile springs form Desmond's fingers that bring anything they come into contact with to life and fight for them. This magic is effective because the springs are fired out like a bullet, making them dangerous in their own right. It can even force guns in hand to change direction.
 
Shunpei’s grandfather. He gave Shunpei Hyde on his 7th birthday. He would travel around the world and whenever he dropped by he would tell Shunpei about his travels and sometime show him magic “tricks”. He lives life “like a man” and tries to teach Shunpei that a man decides his own path in life and that as long as he wants to, a man can achieve anything. He is really one of the greatest magician kings to ever live in the world and his little “tricks” are real magic spells that he can handle effortlessly. It seems most of the world's magic users are after his blood so they become the strongest above the rest, but since he has disappeared off the face of the earth all the attacks are now focused on Shunpei.

A girl who has two shades of hair; black and white. She wears a hat with a pumpkin face smile on the side, a one-piece dress, a long trench coat, and black boots. Pacqwa owns a small store in the Unknown Bazaar, and although she displays many items, most of the items she sells get refunded. She started her magic-device store because of her father, who was a world famous magical item seller. She apologizes frequently.

Enemy Curse users
  
Antonio disguised himself as a delivery man and handed Shunpei the package containing the doll. Chamokey explained why it was trying to kill Shunpei and that he'd be in constant danger for the rest of his life. When, Hyde destroyed Chamokey, it resulted in Antonio driving off a bridge after suffering an array of unlucky circumstances.
Chamokey is a monkey with a fedora and two mouths. He is incredibly sadistic and took great pleasure in tormenting Shunpei as he ran through the house but when Hyde came in his confidence was crushed very quickly. In battle he favors anything that can be used to stab or cut, such as a boxcutter.
  
Chilledski is a Russian curse user who wears a walrus skin like a fur coat (even if he complains about Japan's hot weather). Chilledski was struck with appendix problems after his doll was destroyed, he was rushed to a hospital. After that, Hyde and Closer went looking for him (Hyde uses this as a means to stop being ambushed) and convinced him to help (Hyde does something to his face which causes anyone who sees him to laugh uncontrollably which was effective as Chilledski could not laugh because of his surgery) to show how many other magic users were out to get Closer (1000 in total). Chilledski after more "convincing" revealed information on 'The Six,' the strongest magic users out of the rest moving in to attack. 
Harawataski is a skull jack-in-the-box doll. He says he loves to eat humans' lustful desires. His weapons are a pair of tongs and a small crowbar. His core is a coin with a star on it.
  
A duo who attack Shunpei after school. Bugs takes control on the school's lights in order to give his doll the advantage. After failing to take Shunpei's life, Bugs is thrown in jail for assaulting a janitor and with Seyabdi destroyed he started feeling pain whenever someone steps on his shadow. 
Seyabdi is a shadow puppet with a strange head that uses a knife in combat to strike the finishing blow.
   
Enrique is a young boy whose mother is ill and was led by the Watchman into believing that with Closer's power he would be able to heal his mother. Enrique is the only magician who is able to control two Curse Dolls at once. After both his dolls are destroyed, he nearly falls off the building he was standing on, but was saved by Shunpei at the last second. In regret and gratitude, he informs Shunpei and Hyde about the Watchman.
Kefman is a marionette that looks like a rather sinister clown with four arms. Kefman can manipulate his marionette strings and use them to cut through just about anything.
Michelan is a human-sized puppet with a top hat, who first masquerades as the magician. Michelan knows all offensive and defensive martial arts disciplines, including but not limited to boxing, kung fu, karate and sambo.
  
A duo who attack Shunpei whilst he was training to use his newly acquired magical device. Chi-Chi is an overweight man who loves ramen. He wears a Chinese shirt and small dark glasses. He has a curly mustache and tattoos on his head that resemble three waves.
Wamien is a small, frog-like creature with a porcelain bowl on his head but transforms into a large, muscular reptilian creature when using his magic. Chi-Chi was later badly scalded by hot ramen after, Wamien's subsequent defeat.
  
A duo seeking to destroy the church where the children are because of Feng Shui. Abumiya dresses in a very flamboyant business suit and has one half of the yin-yang symbol tattooed on each of his eyes. He is extremely sadistic as shown in how happily he lists all the morbid things he could do with his doll's magic.
However, underneath all his evil, Abumiya is a true coward and does not know how to deal with those that stand up to him and easily cracking under the pressure. When his doll is destroyed, he gets buried under the garbage in the junkyard. Lancy is a doll that looks like a jiang-shi that floats and has two different halves on his body. The normal half will tell his opponent's good luck and lucky item, while at the same time the other half that looks like a demonic corpse will tell them their bad luck and unlucky item.

He is a powerful man who hired 100 magicians to activate his magic. He does not care what it takes to do something as long as it is done. This is shown when he was warned about the dangers the army of toys could have on other people; he said he did not care as long as the magicians killed Closer. Hyper Toy is unique from other curse dolls in that it is not just one doll, but instead Schubert's entire toy store. However, Schubert's butler warned that using the entire store would only give him minimum control over the dolls and that they would attack anyone near them. After all the toys are destroyed by the combined efforts of Shindou, Ana, and Kazan, the hired magicians place all their power into one doll, a deer costume that gave Schubert incredible strength and speed. After Hyde used his new magic powers to beat him twice, Schubert went insane with power and proceeded to eat the mages who were powering his doll to increase his own strength. When Closer used his new magical tool on him to make illusions, it was revealed that he made toys not for wealth but to see the happy faces of children. After being stunned and filled with regret upon remembering his past, Hyde then used his chainsaw to destroy the doll's core, reducing Schubert to an old man with the mind of a newborn child and removing all evil from his heart.

Faction of The Watcher in the Window

The Watcher is a mysterious magic user who ignited the race to harm Shunpei. He can appears in a floating window which disappears as mysteriously as it appears. He also has a keen grasp on the human psyche, as he manipulated a boy into trying to kill Closer, and most of the wizards in general by lying and telling them that eating his heart would make them invincible. Due to his tactics, Hyde initially believes the Watcher has a personal grudge against the Closer family, only for this to be refuted when The Watcher appears before them after the people he tricked into fighting Closer failed. He reveals that he has no grudge against the family and has actually grown to like Shunpei, but wishes to destroy humanity by getting his hands on Resentment, a gigantic egg that is the oldest magical device, created after a series of coincidences and that has been absorbing the negative emotions of humanity for thousands of years. Alsyd Closer had somehow prevented him from getting it, and so Watchman has been attacking Shunpei to lure him out. He was once a Doctor who lost his family when a shamanistic tribe he'd been treating sacrificed them to appease their gods, driving him mad with grief. In a strange twist of fate, it is revealed that The Watchman himself is 'Detox', the very Magical Device needed to destroy Resentment.

A stuffed panda in the mold of Hyde, but with primitive intelligence. He is briefly introduced during the battle between Closer and The Watcher in the Window as a man framed for spying during the early 1880s, having his family killed in front of his eyes. As he was a sorcerer, he gave life to a stuffed panda by giving his beating heart to the toy as its core so as to avenge his family. Even though he (known as Jack the Ripper) successfully avenged his family, he still murders sorcerers and people for the Watcher in the Window. During his first appearance, he has multiple tentacles that serves as hands. Each of them holds a small scissor, with six in total. He cuts wildly and shrieks, "CUT!CUT!I WANT TO CUT THINGS!" everywhere he goes. As he does so, he wrecks the whole school. He attacks Hyde with his "Murder Ride Show" curse. In the following events some scissors begin to merge into a chainsaw-scissor, and one is destroyed by two of Hyde's curse attack, released from both Closer and Hyde. After several time lapses, he and Hyde's power remain equal, but he is destroyed by Hyde's overpowering final attack. Just as he looks dead, his flying severed top third cuts Hyde into uneven thirds, then flops down dead on the smoking pavement of the building, with a last word of "CUT!".
  
One of the Watcher's allies that willingly wants Resentment to be unleashed. He has a massive ego and fancies himself as a genius and an inventor (e.g. making a toothpaste sandwich for people to eat and clean their teeth at the same time). Pterobone is a living fossil that seems to combine aspects of a triceratops, a pterosaur, and a stegosaur. Aside from its magic, it can fly and split itself into its bones to create multiple attack chances. Pterobone is destroyed by Hyde, and because of the curse backlash, all of the joints in Alshev's body are dislocated and he is sent to the emergency room.

A woman who serves as one of the Watcher's allies out to destroy the device that can cancel out Resentment. Her past is discussed in a story told to the readers by the Watcher: as a child, she was the sole survivor of a fire that broke out and killed all the members of a notorious cult in the southern United States. She was never taught anything about the world around her, and as such lacked the skills to express herself or communicate with others. Adopted by a kindly couple, she was still unable to express herself until she seemed to take an interest in flowers. At the suggestion of her adoptive mother, she spent day after day taking flowers to her room to raise them, but otherwise never left her room. When her adoptive mother went to check on her one day, she found out the girl's secret: she had only been taking the plants to her room to starve them off and watch them die. Appearing to take ecstasy in watching things die, she later moved on to animals, and then humans. Now as an adult, she has a lustful obsession with death and wants Resentment to activate so she can watch death on a global scale. She and Asmodai are sent to stop Shunpei and company from destroying Resentment, she fights against both Shunpei and Shindou in the hospital but quickly proves to be far too powerful for them to defeat. However, they manage to best her by splashing her wax body with caustic soda and alcohol, turning her into a giant soap statue.

Initially presented as the unnamed magician who killed Bosh (Ana's mentor). He was later revealed as one of the Watcher's allies searching to destroy the device that can cancel out Resentment. His past is discussed in a story told to the readers by the Watcher: There were five people trapped in a collapsed tunnel on an American highway, one of them including a pregnant woman. As rescuers worked, one by one the people were killed by a series of lethal misfortunes, until not one survived. However, the fallen rock that killed the pregnant woman left the child unharmed, and it was able to be saved. The deaths were all in fact caused by the unborn Asmodai, who could hear the survivors outside the womb counting off how many survivors were left with each accident and was furious he was never included in the count. He used his magic from within the womb to curse them all to death, and later grew to be the depraved killer he is now. His only motive for aiding the Watcher is his desire to see Resentment destroy the world. He and Ronove are sent to stop Shunpei and company from destroying Resentment, he fights Ana and Kazan in a zoo where he's magic is at its most powerful. Whilst there he overpowers them and talks about how he wishes to devour Resentment because the end of the world would not be as fun if he was not the one causing it.

Publication
Written and illustrated by Haro Aso, Hyde & Closer debuted in Shogakukan's shōnen manga magazine Weekly Shōnen Sunday on December 26, 2007. It was serialized in the magazine until December 2008, when it was transferred to Shogakukan's  website. The series finished on July 3, 2009. Shogakukan collected its chapters into seven tankōbon volumes, released from March 18, 2008, to August 18, 2009.

In North America, the manga was licensed for English release by Viz Media. The series was published online on their ShonenSunday.com website in July 2009. The seven volumes were published between July 13, 2010, and January 10, 2012. The manga was published in France by Akata.

Volume list

Reception
Corrina Lawson of Wired felt that the story was likely to be scary to young children, as toys attack the protagonists, but her sons (11 and 14) enjoyed the character of Hyde, who she described as "the teddy bear version of Nick Fury". Lawson also praised the "genuinely suspenseful" action sequences. Johanna Draper Carlson from Comics Worth reading felt that it was interesting having a boy learn to be a man from a teddy bear, but felt sad that a younger audience who could more appreciate these themes was excluded by the older teen rating of the title. Danica Davidson, writing for Otaku USA, felt the first volume was "tightly written and clever", and found the protagonist very sympathetic. The reviewer for Manga-News describes the beginning as being typical of shonen, depicting a timid protagonist who gains confidence and the ability to protect himself, but felt there were many elements which made Hyde & Closer unique, including an effective graphical style which is dynamic, expressive, and original, and felt that the series would become more in-depth as the story progressed.

References

External links
 
 

2007 manga
Adventure anime and manga
Comedy anime and manga
Fantasy anime and manga
Fictional teddy bears
Shōnen manga
Shogakukan manga
Viz Media manga